Venets (also transliterated Venec or Venetz, meaning "wreath") may refer to the following Bulgarian villages:

 Venets, Burgas Province
 Venets, Shumen Province, the administrative centre of Venets municipality
 Venets Transmitter
 Venets, Stara Zagora Province

See also
 Venet, a surname
 Ignaz Venetz, Swiss scientist